Pablo de Torres may refer to:
Pablo de Torres (bishop) (died 1560), Bishop of Panamá in 1546–1554
Pablo de Torres (kayaker) (born 1984), Argentinean kayaker